Kate Harriet Alexandra Rock, Baroness Rock (born 9 October 1968) is a British Conservative politician and member of the House of Lords. Formerly Vice-Chairman of the Conservative Party with special responsibility for business engagement, she was nominated for a life peerage in August 2015.

Education
Rock was educated at Hanford School, Sherborne School for Girls and Oxford Polytechnic, where she took a BA degree in Publishing and History.

Business career
Between August 2014 and November 2017, Rock served as non-executive director and as chairman of the Remuneration Committee of Imagination Technologies plc (a FTSE 250 high technology company, which was sold to Canyon Bridge Partners).

She also served as a non-executive director of First News (UK) Ltd, a national newspaper for young children, between 2014 and February 2017.

On 1 September 2018 she joined the Board of Keller Group plc (the world's largest provider of geotechnical solutions) and is now the senior independent director, serving on the Audit, Nomination, Remuneration and Health, Safety, Environment and Quality Committees.

In October 2022, it was announced that Rock would succeed Paul Golby as Chair of the Costain Group.

Public service
Between 2015 and 2016 Rock served as Vice-Chairman of the Conservative Party with special responsibility for business engagement.

She was created Baroness Rock, of Stratton in the County of Dorset on 15 October 2015.

In 2016/2017 she was a Visiting Parliamentary Fellow of St Antony's College, Oxford.

Between 2017 and 2018 she was a member of the House of Lords Select Committee on Artificial Intelligence and since 2019 she has sat on the House of Lords Select Committee on Science and Technology. She has also served since May 2018 as a member of the House of Lords Select Committee on the Rural Economy.

In November 2018 she was appointed as a founding board member of the Centre for Data Ethics and Innovation, an advisory body set up by the UK Government to seek to maximise the benefits of data-enabled technologies, including artificial intelligence.

She is also a founding Ambassador of “Women Supporting Women”, a group at The Prince's Trust committed to changing the lives of young women, and is a member of The Prince's Trust's Philanthropy Advisory Board.

Personal life
Her husband Caspar Rock, is Chief Investment Officer at Cazenove Capital Management, the wealth management arm of Schroders in the UK, Channel Islands and Asia.

References

1968 births
Living people
People educated at Hanford School
People educated at Sherborne Girls
Alumni of Oxford Brookes University
Conservative Party (UK) life peers
Life peeresses created by Elizabeth II
Place of birth missing (living people)
21st-century British women politicians